Marcy Borders (July 19, 1973 – August 24, 2015) was an American legal assistant who worked for Bank of America at its branch located in the World Trade Center and survived its collapse (WTC1, WTC2, WTC7), following the attacks on September 11, 2001.

Stan Honda, a photographer for Agence France Presse, captured an image of Borders, completely covered in dust from the building collapse, that subsequently became widely described as "iconic". 
The image became so well known and so widely distributed that Borders became known as "The Dust Lady".

Personal impact
A resident of Bayonne, New Jersey, the 28 year-old Borders was working on the 81st floor inside of the North Tower at the time of the attack. Borders said that she never recovered from the trauma of the attack. Depression led to a break-up with her partner, the loss of custody of her children, and an addiction to alcohol and drugs. Borders said that a key event in her recovery and return to sobriety was learning of the death of Osama bin Laden. Borders had preserved the outfit she wore in the iconic photo.

Cultural impact
The image Honda took of Borders became iconic; she was remembered in many retrospective articles about the attacks of 9/11. The Daily Telegraph chose her as one of the survivors they profiled on the tenth anniversary of the attack. Borders had been invited to spend the tenth anniversary of 9/11 at a memorial event in Germany.

Cancer diagnosis and death
Borders was diagnosed with stomach cancer in August 2014. Borders's cancer had resulted in a $190,000 debt—even though she had not yet received surgery and she still needed additional chemotherapy. Borders said she could not even afford to get her prescriptions filled. She alleged that her cancer was triggered by the toxic dust she was exposed to when the World Trade Center collapsed, having once stated, "I definitely believe it because I haven't had any illnesses. I don't have high blood pressure, high cholesterol, diabetes." Borders died from cancer on August 24, 2015.

In fiction
"The Dust Lady" photo is mentioned in Julie Buxbaum's novel Hope and Other Punch Lines, about the subject of a fictional photo from 9/11.

References

External links

Survivors of the September 11 attacks
1973 births
2015 deaths
African-American history in New York City
Deaths from cancer in New Jersey
Deaths from stomach cancer
People from Bayonne, New Jersey
People notable for being the subject of a specific photograph